The women's aerials competition of the FIS Freestyle Ski and Snowboarding World Championships 2017 was held at Sierra Nevada, Spain on March 9 (qualifying)  and March 10 (finals). 
22 athletes from 9 countries competed.

Qualification

The following are the results of the qualification.

Final
The following are the results of the finals.

References

Aerials, women's